Events from the year 1554 in India.

Events
 Date unclear – Firuz Shah Suri succeeds Islam Shah Suri as Sultan of Delhi 
 Date unclear – Muhammad Adil Shah succeeds Firuz Shah Suri as Sultan of Delhi

Births

Deaths
 22 November – Islam Shah Suri, Sultan of Delhi
 Date unclear but 12 days or more after 22 November – Firuz Shah Suri, Sultan of Delhi

See also
 Timeline of Indian history

References

 
India